The 2011 Mansfield District Council election took place on 5 May 2011 to elect members of Mansfield District Council in Nottinghamshire, England. The whole council was up for election as was the directly-elected executive mayor.

The ward boundaries were reorganised, reducing the number of members from 46 (spread over the previous 19 wards) to 36 single-member wards. Re-aligning the wards by considering geographical area and housing density reflected a more-even number of voters per ward.

Overall election results

Mansfield District Council (Summary of Overall Results)

Mansfield District Council - Results by Ward

Abbott

Berry Hill

Brick Kiln

Broomhill

Bull Farm

Carr Bank

Eakring

Grange Farm

Holly

Hornby

Kings Walk

Kingsway

Ladybrook

Lindhurst

Ling Forest

Manor

Market Warsop

Maun Valley

Meden

Netherfield

Newgate

Newlands

Oak Tree

Oakham

Park Hall

Peafields

Penniment

Portland

Racecourse

Ransom Wood

Sandhurst

Sherwood

Warsop Carrs

Woodhouse

Woodlands

Yeoman Hill

By-Elections between May 2011 - May 2015

By-elections are called when a representative Councillor resigns or dies, so are unpredictable.  A by-election is held to fill a political office that has become vacant between the scheduled elections.

Park Hall - 20 October 2011

Netherfield - 4 December 2014

Mansfield Mayoral Election 5 May 2011

Mansfield has a directly elected mayor.

References

2010s in Nottinghamshire
2011
2011 English local elections